The Erdős–Tenenbaum–Ford constant is a mathematical constant that appears in number theory. Named after mathematicians Paul Erdős, Gérald Tenenbaum, and Kevin Ford, it is defined as

where  is the natural logarithm.

Following up on earlier work by Tenenbaum, Ford used this constant in analyzing the number  of integers that are at most  and that have a divisor in the range .

Multiplication table problem 

For each positive integer , let  be the number of distinct integers in an  multiplication table.

References

External links 
 Decimal digits of the Erdős–Tenenbaum–Ford constant on the OEIS

Mathematical constants
Number theory